Oak Grove is a census-designated place and unincorporated community in Sumner County, Tennessee, United States. Its population was 231 as of the 2010 census.
Oak Grove was the hometown of trial attorney James F. Neal.

References

Census-designated places in Sumner County, Tennessee
Census-designated places in Tennessee
Unincorporated communities in Tennessee